Cockram or similar may mean:
Alan Cockeram (1894 - 1957), a mining executive, military officer and Canadian politician
Allan Cockram, a retired English professional footballer who played for Tottenham Hotspur
Felicity Cockram, an Australian film producer
Henry Cockeram (flourished 1623–1658), an English lexicographer
Jeremi Cockram, a Welsh television actor
W W Cockram Stakes, a Melbourne Racing Club Group 3 Australian Thoroughbred horse race

See also 

Cochrane (disambiguation)